This article gives a chronological list of years in poetry (descending order). These pages supplement the List of years in literature pages with a focus on events in the history of poetry.

21st century in poetry

2020s 
 2023 in poetry
 2022 in poetry
 2021 in poetry
 2020 in poetry - Lana Del Rey's Violet Bent Backwards Over the Grass

2010s 
 2019 in poetry
 2018 in poetry
 2017 in poetry
 2016 in poetry
 2015 in poetry
 2014 in poetry Death of Madeline Gins, Amiri Baraka, Juan Gelman, José Emilio Pacheco, Maya Angelou
 2013 in poetry Death of Thomas McEvilley, Taylor Mead, Seamus Heaney
 2012 in poetry Günter Grass's poem "What Must Be Said" leads to him being declared persona non grata; Death of Adrienne Rich, Wisława Szymborska
 2011 in poetry Tomas Tranströmer awarded the Nobel Prize in Literature; Liz Lochhead succeeds Edwin Morgan as The Scots Makar; Death of Josephine Hart, Václav Havel, Robert Kroetsch
 2010 in poetry Seamus Heaney's Human Chain; Death of Tuli Kupferberg, Peter Orlovsky, P. Lal, Edwin Morgan

2000s 
 2009 in poetry Turkish government posthumously restores Nâzım Hikmet's citizenship, stripped from him because of his beliefs; Ruth Padel the first woman elected Oxford Professor of Poetry, only to resign in controversy before taking office; Carol Ann Duffy succeeds Andrew Motion as the UK's Poet Laureate; Elizabeth Alexander reads "Praise Song for the Day" at presidential inauguration of U.S. President Barack Obama; Death of Dennis Brutus, Jim Carroll, Nicholas Hughes (son of Ted Hughes and Sylvia Plath)
 2008 in poetry Death of Harold Pinter, Jonathan Williams
 2007 in poetry Death of William Morris Meredith, Jr., Emmett Williams
 2006 in poetry Seamus Heaney's District and Circle; Death of Stanley Kunitz
 2005 in poetry Harold Pinter awarded the Nobel Prize in Literature; Death of Philip Lamantia, Robert Creeley
 2004 in poetry Seamus Heaney reads "Beacons of Bealtaine" for 25 leaders of the enlarged European Union; Edwin Morgan named as The Scots Makar; Death of Janet Frame, Jackson Mac Low, Czesław Miłosz
 2003 in poetry John Paul II's Roman Triptych (Meditation); Kenneth Rexroth's  Complete Poems (posthumous)
 2002 in poetry Death of Kenneth Koch
 2001 in poetry Seamus Heaney's Electric Light; First-ever Griffin Poetry Prize in Canada; Death of Gregory Corso
 2000 in poetry Death of Yehuda Amichai, Ahmad Shamlou

20th century in poetry

1990s 
 1999 in poetry Andrew Motion succeeds Ted Hughes as the UK's Poet Laureate; Julia Donaldson's The Gruffalo; Death of Edward Dorn
 1998 in poetry Ted Hughes's Birthday Letters; Death of Zbigniew Herbert, Ted Hughes, Octavio Paz
 1997 in poetry Death of William Burroughs, Allen Ginsberg, James Dickey, Denise Levertov, David Ignatow, James Laughlin, William Matthews
 1996 in poetry Seamus Heaney's The Spirit Level; Wisława Szymborska awarded the Nobel Prize in Literature;  Death of Joseph Brodsky
 1995 in poetry Seamus Heaney awarded the Nobel Prize in Literature; Death of May Sarton, Sir Stephen Spender CBE, David Avidan
 1994 in poetry Death of Charles Bukowski
 1993 in poetry Maya Angelou reads "On the Pulse of Morning" at the inauguration of U.S. President Bill Clinton
 1992 in poetry Derek Walcott awarded the Nobel Prize in Literature; Death of Eve Merriam
 1991 in poetry Death of Dr. Seuss, James Schuyler, Howard Nemerov
 1990 in poetry Octavio Paz awarded the Nobel Prize in Literature; Death of Lawrence Durrell

1980s 
 1989 in poetry Death of Samuel Beckett, Robert Penn Warren, May Swenson
 1988 in poetry Death of Máirtín Ó Direáin, Miguel Piñero, Robert Duncan
 1987 in poetry Joseph Brodsky awarded the Nobel Prize in Literature; Ezra Pound and Louis Zukofsky, Pound/Zukofsky: Selected Letters of Ezra Pound and Louis Zukofsky, edited by Barry Ahearn (Faber & Faber)
 1986 in poetry Wole Soyinka awarded the Nobel Prize in Literature; Death of John Ciardi, Jean Genet, Jaroslav Seifert
 1985 in poetry Death of Robert Graves, Philip Larkin
 1984 in poetry Jaroslav Seifert awarded the Nobel Prize in Literature; Ted Hughes succeeds John Betjeman as the UK's Poet Laureate (on the refusal of Philip Larkin); Death of George Oppen
 1983 in poetry Death of Ted Berrigan, Edwin Denby
 1982 in poetry Death of Kenneth Rexroth, Archibald MacLeish, Djuna Barnes
 1981 in poetry Death of Christy Brown
 1980 in poetry Czesław Miłosz awarded the Nobel Prize in Literature; Death of Muriel Rukeyser

1970s 
 1979 in poetry Death of Elizabeth Bishop; Jacqueline Osherow is awarded the Chancellor's Gold Medal for an English Poem
 1978 in poetry Death of Micheál Mac Liammóir
 1977 in poetry Death of Robert Lowell, Vladimir Nabokov, Seán Ó Ríordáin
 1976 in poetry
 1975 in poetry
 1974 in poetry Death of Miguel Ángel Asturias, Anne Sexton; Philip Larkin's  High Windows
 1973 in poetry Death of W. H. Auden, Pablo Neruda, J. R. R. Tolkien
 1972 in poetry John Betjeman succeeds Cecil Day-Lewis as the UK's Poet Laureate; Death of John Berryman, Kenneth Patchen, Padraic Colum, Marianne Moore, Richard Church, Cecil Day-Lewis, Ezra Pound, Mark Van Doren, Paul Goodman
 1971 in poetry Pablo Neruda awarded the Nobel Prize in Literature; Death of Jim Morrison, Ogden Nash
 1970 in poetry Death of Nelly Sachs, Charles Olson, Paul Celan, Leah Goldberg

1960s 
 1969 in poetry Samuel Beckett awarded the Nobel Prize in Literature; Death of Jack Kerouac, André Salmon
 1968 in poetry Leonard Cohen, Selected Poems, 1956-1968
 1967 in poetry Cecil Day-Lewis selected as the UK's new Poet Laureate (succeeding John Masefield); Death of Patrick Kavanagh, John Masefield, Carl Sandburg
 1966 in poetry Seamus Heaney's Death of a Naturalist; Death of Anna Akhmatova, André Breton, Frank O'Hara, Basil Bunting's Briggflatts
 1965 in poetry Death of T. S. Eliot
 1964 in poetry John Lennon's In His Own Write, containing nonsensical poems, sketches and drawings (a best seller by the member of the Beatles); Something Else Press founded by Dick Higgins in 1963 (publishes concrete poetry by several authors, starting in 1964), Philip Larkin's The Whitsun Weddings; Death of Brendan Behan, Dame Edith Sitwell DBE
 1963 in poetry Bob Dylan's album The Freewheelin' Bob Dylan released (with his most influential early songwriting); Death of Nâzım Hikmet, Louis MacNeice, Sylvia Plath, Robert Frost, William Carlos Williams, Tristan Tzara, Jean Cocteau
 1962 in poetry Death of E. E. Cummings
 1961 in poetry Allen Ginsberg's Kaddish and Other Poems; death of H. D.,Death of Rabindranath Tagore
 1960 in poetry Dr. Seuss's Green Eggs and Ham; Death of Boris Pasternak

1950s 
 1959 in poetry Death of Edgar Guest, Lakshmi Prasad Devkota
 1958 in poetry Boris Pasternak awarded the Nobel Prize in Literature; Death of Alfred Noyes, Robert W. Service; Ezra Pound's indictment for treason is dismissed. He is released from St. Elizabeths Hospital, an insane asylum in Maryland, after spending 12 years there (starting in 1946)
 1957 in poetry Howl obscenity trial in San Francisco, Ted Hughes's The Hawk in the Rain, Dr. Seuss's The Cat in the Hat and How the Grinch Stole Christmas; Death of Oliver St. John Gogarty
 1956 in poetry Allen Ginsberg's Howl and Other Poems,  a signature of the Beat Generation published by City Lights Books, United States; Birth of Cathal Ó Searcaigh
 1955 in poetry Discovery of the Hinilawod by F. Landa Jocano; Death of Wallace Stevens; Birth of Paula Meehan, William Wall
 1954 in poetry Dr. Seuss's Horton Hears a Who!
 1953 in poetry Death of Dylan Thomas; Birth of Frank McGuinness
 1952 in poetry Death of Paul Éluard, George Santayana; Birth of Nuala Ní Dhomhnaill
 1951 in poetry Birth of Paul Muldoon
 1950 in poetry Death of Edna St. Vincent Millay; Birth of Mary Dorcey, Medbh McGuckian

1940s 
 1949 in poetry Birth of Gabriel Rosenstock
 1948 in poetry T. S. Eliot awarded the Nobel Prize in Literature
 1947 in poetry Cleanth Brooks's The Well Wrought Urn: Studies in the Structure of Poetry (a classic statement of the New Criticism); Birth of Dermot Healy
 1946 in poetry "On Raglan Road" first published, with the title "Dark Haired Miriam Ran Away"; Ezra Pound brought back to the United States on treason charges, but found unfit to face trial because of insanity and sent to St. Elizabeths Hospital in Washington, D.C., where he remained for 12 years; Death of Gertrude Stein
 1945 in poetry Death of Paul Valéry, Robert Desnos, Zinaida Gippius; Birth of Van Morrison, OBE 
 1944 in poetry Birth of Eavan Boland, Paul Durcan
 1943 in poetry Death of Stephen Vincent Benét, William Soutar in Perth; Birth of Jim Morrison; T. S. Eliot's Four Quartets published as a whole
 1942 in poetry Birth of William Matthews, Eiléan Ní Chuilleanáin; Death of Konstantin Balmont
 1941 in poetry Death of James Joyce, Marina Tsvetaeva; Birth of Bob Dylan, Derek Mahon
 1940 in poetry Birth of Joseph Brodsky, John Lennon

1930s 
 1939 in poetry Death of W. B. Yeats; Birth of Seamus Heaney, Michael Longley; T.S. Eliot's Old Possum's Book of Practical Cats
 1938 in poetry Death of Osip Mandelstam
 1937 in poetry Lahuta e Malcís - Gjergj Fishta; First-ever Governor General's Literary Awards in Canada; Birth of Diane Wakoski
 1936 in poetry Killing of Federico García Lorca, Death of Rudyard Kipling; Birth of John Giorno
 1935 in poetry Charles G. D. Roberts knighted for his poetry; Anna Akhmatova begins publishing her cycle of poems Requiem
 1934 in poetry Death of Andrei Bely; Birth of Leonard Cohen, Wole Soyinka
 1933 in poetry The Winding Stair - W.B. Yeats; Death of Sara Teasdale; Birth of Yevgeny Yevtushenko
 1932 in poetry Death of Hart Crane; Birth of Christy Brown, Michael McClure, David Antin, Sylvia Plath
 1931 in poetry Death of Vachel Lindsay, Kahlil Gibran; Birth of Tomas Tranströmer
 1930 in poetry John Masefield succeeds Robert Bridges as the UK's Poet Laureate;  Death of Robert Bridges, D. H. Lawrence, Vladimir Mayakovsky; birth of Gary Snyder, Adunis, Harold Pinter, Derek Walcott

1920s 
 1929 in poetry Pulitzer Prize for Poetry awarded to Stephen Vincent Benét for John Brown's Body; Birth of Ed Dorn, John Montague
 1928 in poetry The Tower (book) - W.B. Yeats; Birth of Maya Angelou, Thomas Kinsella; Death of Thomas Hardy
 1927 in poetry William Soutar creates his Epigram form of the Cinquain; Birth of John Ashbery
 1926 in poetry Death of Rainer Maria Rilke, Birth of Allen Ginsberg, Robert Creeley, Frank O'Hara
 1925 in poetry Death of Sergei Yesenin, Birth of Ahmad Shamlou
 1924 in poetry Birth of Yehuda Amichai, Janet Frame, Zbigniew Herbert
 1923 in poetry W. B. Yeats is the first Irishman awarded the Nobel Prize in Literature; Edna St. Vincent Millay is the first woman to win the Pulitzer Prize for Poetry; Birth of Brendan Behan, Yves Bonnefoy, Wisława Szymborska, Aco Šopov
 1922 in poetry T. S. Eliot's "The Waste Land"; Rainer Maria Rilke completes both the Duino Elegies and the Sonnets to Orpheus; Birth of Jack Kerouac, Máire Mhac an tSaoi
 1921 in poetry Birth of Vasko Popa, Death of Alexander Blok
 1920 in poetry The Epic of Manas is published; approximate date of Mikhail Khudiakov's Dorvyzhy; The Dial, a longstanding American literary magazine, is re-established by Scofield Thayer, with the publication becoming an important outlet for Modernist poets and writers (until 1929), with contributors this year including Sherwood Anderson, Djuna Barnes, Kenneth Burke, Hart Crane, E. E. Cummings, Charles Demuth, Kahlil Gibran, Gaston Lachaise, Amy Lowell, Marianne Moore, Ezra Pound, Odilon Redon, Bertrand Russell, Carl Sandburg, Van Wyck Brooks, and W. B. Yeats; Birth of Paul Celan, Charles Bukowski

1910s 
 1919 in poetry Birth of Lawrence Ferlinghetti, Robert Duncan, May Swenson, William Meredith
 1918 in poetry Death of Guillaume Apollinaire, Wilfred Owen; Gerard Manley Hopkins's Poems published posthumously by Robert Bridges
 1917 in poetry Birth of Robert Lowell; T. S. Eliot's Prufrock and other Observations
 1916 in poetry The Dada movement in art, poetry and literature coalesced at Cabaret Voltaire in Zurich, Switzerland, where Hugo Ball, Emmy Hennings, Tristan Tzara, Hans Arp, Richard Huelsenbeck, Sophie Täuber and others discussed art and put on performances expressing their disgust with World War I and the interests they believed inspired it; Death of Patrick Pearse, Joseph Mary Plunkett; Birth of Tom Kettle
 1915 in poetry Death of Rupert Brooke
 1914 in poetry Death of Adelaide Crapsey; Birth of William Burroughs, Octavio Paz, Dylan Thomas
 1913 in poetry Rabindranath Tagore awarded the Nobel Prize in Literature, Robert Bridges succeeds Alfred Austin as the UK's Poet Laureate; The launch of Imagism in the pages of Poetry magazine by H.D., Richard Aldington and Ezra Pound, Robert Frost's A Boy's Will; Death of Alfred Austin, Lesya Ukrainka; birth of R. S. Thomas
 1912 in poetry Adelaide Crapsey creates her couplet form
 1911 in poetry Adelaide Crapsey creates the American Cinquain form; Birth of Leah Goldberg, Czesław Miłosz
 1910 in poetry Death of Julia Ward Howe; Birth of Charles Olson, Jean Genet

1900s 
 1909 in poetry Death of Sarah Orne Jewett; Birth of Stephen Spender
 1908 in poetry
 1907 in poetry Rudyard Kipling awarded the Nobel Prize in Literature; Birth of W. H. Auden, Louis MacNeice
 1906 in poetry Alfred Noyes publishes The Highwayman; Birth of Samuel Beckett
 1905 in poetry
 1904 in poetry Birth of Cecil Day-Lewis, Patrick Kavanagh, Pablo Neruda
 1903 in poetry
 1902 in poetry Death of Shiki the haiku poet; Birth of Langston Hughes ; Giles Lytton Strachey is awarded the Chancellor's Gold Medal for an English Poem
 1901 in poetry Birth of Jaroslav Seifert
 1900 in poetry Death of Oscar Wilde

19th century in poetry

1890s 
 1899 in poetry Birth of Hart Crane, Micheál Mac Liammóir, Vladimir Nabokov
 1898 in poetry Death of Stéphane Mallarmé, Lewis Carroll; Birth of Stephen Vincent Benét, Federico García Lorca, William Soutar 
 1897 in poetry 
 1896 in poetry Death of Paul Verlaine
 1895 in poetry Birth of Robert Graves, Sergei Yesenin
 1894 in poetry Death of Charles Marie René Leconte de Lisle, Oliver Wendell Holmes, Sr.
 1893 in poetry Birth of Vladimir Mayakovsky
 1892 in poetry Emily Dickinson First collection published; Death of Walt Whitman James Russell Lowell, Alfred Lord Tennyson, Afanasy Fet; Birth of Marina Tsvetaeva, Hugh MacDiarmid
 1891 in poetry Death of Arthur Rimbaud, Herman Melville; Birth of Nelly Sachs, Osip Mandelstam
 1890 in poetry Birth of Boris Pasternak

1880s 
 1889 in poetry Birth of Anna Akhmatova; death of Gerard Manley Hopkins
 1888 in poetry Birth of T. S. Eliot
 1887 in poetry Lāčplēsis by Andrejs Pumpurs; Birth of Marianne Moore, Joseph Plunkett, Edith Sitwell DBE
 1886 in poetry Death of Emily Dickinson; birth of H.D.
 1885 in poetry Birth of D. H. Lawrence, Ezra Pound; Death of Victor Hugo
 1884 in poetry
 1883 in poetry Birth of William Carlos Williams
 1882 in poetry Death of Ralph Waldo Emerson, Henry Wadsworth Longfellow; Birth of James Joyce, A. A. Milne
 1881 in poetry
 1880 in poetry Birth of Guillaume Apollinaire, Andrei Bely, Tom Kettle, Alfred Noyes, Alexander Blok

1870s 
 1879 in poetry Birth of Patrick Pearse, Wallace Stevens
 1878 in poetry Birth of Oliver St. John Gogarty, Carl Sandburg, John Edward Masefield, Adelaide Crapsey
 1877 in poetry Jacint Verdaguer's L'Atlàntida
 1876 in poetry Death of John Neal
 1875 in poetry French translation of Edgar Allan Poe's "The Raven", by Stéphane Mallarmé with drawings by Édouard Manet; - Birth of Rainer Maria Rilke, important pre-modernist 20th-century poet in German.
 1874 in poetry Arthur Rimbaud's IlluminationsFirst collection of George Eliot's poetry; - Birth of Gertrude Stein, Robert Frost, important American poet
 1873 in poetry Arthur Rimbaud's Une Saison en Enfer (A Season in Hell); Publication of Daredevils of Sassoun; Death of Fyodor Tyutchev
 1872 in poetry Christina Rossetti's In the Bleak Midwinter (Christmas carol); José Hernández's Martín Fierro; Michel Rodange's Rénert the Fox
 1871 in poetry Lewis Carroll publishes Through the Looking-Glass, including the complete Jabberwocky. Arthur Rimbaud wrote "Letters of the Seer." Birth of Lesya Ukrainka, important Ukrainian poet
 1870 in poetry

1860s 
 1869 in poetry George Eliot sonnet Brother & Sister; Birth of Zinaida Gippius, important Russian poet
 1868 in poetry
 1867 in poetry Death of Charles Baudelaire, French poet and art critic; Birth of Shiki the haiku poet, Konstantin Balmont, Russian symbolist poet
 1866 in poetry
 1865 in poetry Birth of William Butler Yeats, Rudyard Kipling
 1864 in poetry Death of John Clare, Walter Savage Landor
 1863 in poetry
 1862 in poetry Christina Rossetti Goblin Market, George Meredith's Modern Love
 1861 in poetry Death of Taras Shevchenko, Birth of Rabindranath Tagore
 1860 in poetry

1850s 
 1859 in poetry Death of Leigh Hunt 
 1858 in poetry Henry Wadsworth Longfellow, The Courtship of Miles Standish
 1857 in poetry Charles Baudelaire's Les Fleurs du mal 1856 in poetry Death of Heinrich Heine; - Aurora Leigh by Elizabeth Barrett Browning
 1855 in poetry Walt Whitman's Leaves of Grass, a first stanza of Lewis Carroll's Jabberwocky, Henry Wadsworth Longfellow's The Song of Hiawatha; - Death of Adam Mickiewicz
 1854 in poetry Birth of Arthur Rimbaud
 1853 in poetry First and unprinted version of Friedrich Reinhold Kreutzwald's Kalevipoeg 1852 in poetry Death of Thomas Moore
 1851 in poetry
 1850 in poetry Elizabeth Barrett Browning, Sonnets from the Portuguese; Robert Browning Christmas-Eve and Easter-Day; - Death of William Wordsworth

 1840s 
 1849 in poetry Death of Edgar Allan Poe, Edgar Allan Poe's Annabel Lee,  Birth of Sarah Orne Jewett (Martha's Lady)
 1848 in poetry Founding of Pre-Raphaelite Brotherhood
 1847 in poetry Henry Wadsworth Longfellow's Evangeline; Petar II Petrović-Njegoš's The Mountain Wreath 1846 in poetry
 1845 in poetry Edgar Allan Poe's The Raven 1844 in poetry Birth of Paul Verlaine
 1843 in poetry William Wordsworth becomes Poet Laureate 
 1842 in poetry Birth of Stéphane Mallarmé; Alfred Tennyson Poems 1841 in poetry Death of Mikhail Lermontov
 1840 in poetry Birth of Thomas Hardy

 1830s 
 1839 in poetry
 1838 in poetry Florante at Laura by Francisco Balagtas
 1837 in poetry Death of Aleksandr Pushkin
 1836 in poetry The Baptism on the Savica by France Prešeren
 1835 in poetry The Kalevala by Elias Lönnrot
 1834 in poetry Pan Tadeusz by Adam Mickiewicz; Death of Samuel Taylor Coleridge
 1833 in poetry
 1832 in poetry Birth of Lewis Carroll; Death of Sir Walter Scott, Johann Wolfgang von Goethe
 1831 in poetry Birth of Emily Dickinson
 1830 in poetry Birth of Christina Rossetti  in London

 1820s 
 1829 in poetry Alfred Lord Tennyson is awarded the Chancellor's Gold Medal for an English Poem 
 1828 in poetry Birth of Dante Gabriel Rossetti
 1827 in poetry Death of William Blake
 1826 in poetry Death of Issa the haiku poet
 1825 in poetry Alexander Pushkin begins publishing Eugene Onegin in serial form
 1824 in poetry Death of Lord Byron, important English Romantic poet
 1823 in poetry Birth of Sándor Petőfi, Hungarian national poet Winthrop Mackworth Praed is awarded the Chancellor's Gold Medal for an English Poem, Clement Clarke Moore A Visit from St. Nicholas 
 1822 in poetry Lord Byron The Vision of Judgment; Death of Percy Bysshe Shelley, important English Romantic poet
 1821 in poetry Death of John Keats, important English Romantic poet; - Birth of Charles Baudelaire, French poet and art critic
 1820 in poetry

 1810s 
 1819 in poetry Scholars described - The Great Year for John Keats, who publishes his famous Odes; Don Juan (Byron) - Lord Byron; - Birth of George Eliot, Walt Whitman, important American poet, Herman Melville, American poet, novelist, James Russell Lowell, American poet, Julia Ward Howe, American poet
 1818 in poetry Lord Byron's Childe Harold's Pilgrimage, Book IV, published; - Birth of Charles Marie René Leconte de Lisle; - Mary Shelley (née Mary Wollstonecraft Godwin publishes Frankenstein; or, The Modern Prometheus anonymously; Percy Bysshe Shelley's Ozymandias 1817 in poetry Percy Bysshe Shelley, Laon and Cythna 1816 in poetry Shelley marries Mary Woolstonecraft Godwin, Lord Byron's Childe Harold's Pilgrimage, Book III, published; Samuel Coleridge's Kubla Khan 1815 in poetry
 1814 in poetry West-östlicher Diwan - Johann Wolfgang von Goethe; She Walks in Beauty - Lord Byron; Percy Bysshe Shelley and Mary Wollstonecraft Godwin elope to war-ravaged France, accompanied by Godwin's stepsister, Mary Jane. Birth of Mikhail Lermontov, important Russian poet; Birth of Taras Shevchenko, important Ukrainian poet
 1813 in poetry The Chancellor's Gold Medal for an English Poem is awarded for the first time. Recipient is George Waddington.
 1812 in poetry Childe Harold's Pilgrimage - Lord Byron; Birth of Afanasy Fet, important Russian poet
 1811 in poetry
 1810 in poetry Milton: a Poem, epic poem by William Blake, written and illustrated between 1804 and 1810

 1800s 
 1809 in poetry Birth of Edgar Allan Poe, Alfred Lord Tennyson, Oliver Wendell Holmes, Sr. American poet, physician, and essayist
 1808 in poetry Johann Wolfgang von Goethe - Faust, Part One 1807 in poetry Birth of Henry Wadsworth Longfellow, John Greenleaf Whittier
 1806 in poetry Birth of Elizabeth Barrett Browning
 1805 in poetry Jerusalem poem by William Blake; - Death of Friedrich Schiller, German poet
 1804 in poetry
 1803 in poetry Birth of Fyodor Tyutchev, important Russian poet
 1802 in poetry Birth of Victor Hugo 
 1801 in poetry
 1800 in poetry Death of William Cowper

18th century in poetry

 1790s 
 1799 in poetry Birth of Aleksandr Pushkin, important Russian poet
 1798 in poetry William Wordsworth and Samuel Taylor Coleridge publish Lyrical Ballads. Birth of Adam Mickiewicz, important Polish poet
 1797 in poetry Birth of Mary Wollstonecraft Godwin, Heinrich Heine
 1796 in poetry Death of Robert Burns, James Macpherson
 1795 in poetry Birth of John Keats, important English poet; - William Blake, The Book of Los, The Book of Ahania, The Song of Los 1794 in poetry Songs of Innocence and of Experience: Shewing the Two Contrary States of the Human Soul two books of poetry and The Book of Urizen by English poet and painter William Blake
 1793 in poetry William Blake, Visions of the Daughters of Albion and America, A Prophecy; - Birth of John Clare, John Neal
 1792 in poetry Birth of Percy Bysshe Shelley, important English poet; - William Blake Song of Liberty 1791 in poetry William Blake, The French Revolution 1790 in poetry William Blake, The Marriage of Heaven and Hell 1780s 
 1789 in poetry William Blake publishes Songs of Innocence and The Book of Thel 1788 in poetry Birth of Lord Byron, (English)
 1787 in poetry
 1786 in poetry Robert Burns publishes Poems Chiefly in the Scottish Dialect 
 1785 in poetry William Cowper publishes The Task 1784 in poetry Birth of Leigh Hunt; Death of Samuel Johnson English author, wrote Lives of the Most Eminent English Poets, (1779–81)
 1783 in poetry Death of Buson the haiku poet
 1782 in poetry
 1781 in poetry
 1780 in poetry

 1770s 
 1779 in poetry Birth of Irish poet Thomas Moore 
 1778 in poetry
 1777 in poetry
 1776 in poetry
 1775 in poetry Birth of Charles Lamb, Walter Savage Landor
 1774 in poetry Birth of Robert Southey; Death of Oliver Goldsmith
 1773 in poetry Eibhlín Dubh Ní Chonaill composes "Caoineadh Airt Uí Laoghaire"
 1772 in poetry "Prometheus" - Johann Wolfgang von Goethe; Birth of Samuel Taylor Coleridge
 1771 in poetry Death of Thomas Gray, English poet, (born 1716); - Birth of Sir Walter Scott
 1770 in poetry Birth of William Wordsworth, important English poet (died 1850); - Death of Thomas Chatterton, 17-year-old English poet and forger of pseudo-medieval poetry born 1752

 1760s 
 1769 in poetry
 1768 in poetry
 1767 in poetry
 1766 in poetry
 1765 in poetry Thomas Percy, Reliques of Ancient English Poetry; Kristijonas Donelaitis, The Seasons 1764 in poetry Oliver Goldsmith, The Traveller 1763 in poetry Birth of Samuel Rogers
 1762 in poetry Birth of Issa the haiku poet
 1761 in poetry
 1760 in poetry

 1750s 
 1759 in poetry Birth of Robert Burns, Friedrich Schiller, German poet philosopher, and dramatist (died 1805)
 1758 in poetry
 1757 in poetry
 1756 in poetry
 1755 in poetry
 1754 in poetry
 1753 in poetry
 1752 in poetry
 1751 in poetry
 1750 in poetry

 1740s 
 1749 in poetry Birth of Johann Wolfgang von Goethe, German poet and author
 1748 in poetry Death of James Thomson
 1747 in poetry
 1746 in poetry
 1745 in poetry Death of Jonathan Swift, Anglo-Irish satirist, essayist, political pamphleteer, poet
 1744 in poetry Death of Alexander Pope, English poet; - Anonymous, Tommy Thumb's Pretty Song Book, the first extant collection of nursery rhymes
 1743 in poetry Death of Richard Savage, English poet
 1742 in poetry
 1741 in poetry
 1740 in poetry

 1730s 
 1739 in poetry
 1738 in poetry
 1737 in poetry
 1736 in poetry Birth of James Macpherson, Scottish poet
 1735 in poetry
 1734 in poetry
 1733 in poetry
 1732 in poetry
 1731 in poetry
 1730 in poetry

 1720s 
 1729 in poetry
 1728 in poetry
 1727 in poetry
 1726 in poetry
 1725 in poetry
 1724 in poetry
 1723 in poetry
 1722 in poetry
 1721 in poetry
 1720 in poetry

 1710s 
 1719 in poetry Death of Joseph Addison, English essayist and poet
 1718 in poetry
 1717 in poetry
 1716 in poetry First printed version of the Epic of King Gesar; First printed version of The Jangar Epic; Birth of Thomas Gray, English poet, (died 1771)
 1715 in poetry Birth of Buson the haiku poet
 1714 in poetry First printed version of Popol Vuh 1713 in poetry
 1712 in poetry
 1711 in poetry
 1710 in poetry

 1700s 
 1709 in poetry Birth of Samuel Johnson, English author, biographer
 1708 in poetry
 1707 in poetry
 1706 in poetry
 1705 in poetry Death of Michael Wigglesworth (born 1631), English poet, colonist in America called "the most popular of early New England poets"
 1704 in poetry
 1703 in poetry
 1702 in poetry
 1701 in poetry
 1700 in poetry Hikayat Hang Tuah; Death of John Dryden, influential English poet, literary critic, translator and playwright; - Birth of James Thomson, English poet

17th century in poetry

 1690s 
 1699 in poetry
 1698 in poetry
 1697 in poetry Birth of Richard Savage, English poet
 1696 in poetry
 1695 in poetry
 1694 in poetry Death of the haiku poet Matsuo Bashō
 1693 in poetry
 1692 in poetry
 1691 in poetry
 1690 in poetry

 1680s 
 1689 in poetry Oku no Hosomichi by Matsuo Bashō
 1688 in poetry Birth of Alexander Pope, English poet
 1687 in poetry
 1686 in poetry
 1685 in poetry
 1684 in poetry
 1683 in poetry
 1682 in poetry
 1681 in poetry
 1680 in poetry

 1670s 
 1679 in poetry
 1678 in poetry
 1677 in poetry
 1676 in poetry
 1675 in poetry
 1674 in poetry Death of John Milton, important English poet
 1673 in poetry
 1672 in poetry Birth of Joseph Addison, English essayist and poet
 1671 in poetry
 1670 in poetry

 1660s 
 1669 in poetry
 1668 in poetry
 1667 in poetry Birth of Jonathan Swift, Anglo-Irish satirist, essayist, political pamphleteer, poet
 1666 in poetry
 1665 in poetry
 1664 in poetry Anne Bradstreet, Meditations Divine and Moral 1663 in poetry
 1662 in poetry
 1661 in poetry
 1660 in poetry

 1650s 
 1659 in poetry
 1658 in poetry
 1657 in poetry
 1656 in poetry
 1655 in poetry
 1654 in poetry
 1653 in poetry
 1652 in poetry
 1651 in poetry
 1650 in poetry

 1640s 
 1649 in poetry
 1648 in poetry
 1647 in poetry The Siege of Sziget by Miklós Zrínyi; April 1 — birth of John Wilmot, Earl of Rochester (died 1680)
 1646 in poetry
 1645 in poetry
 1644 in poetry Birth of Matsuo Bashō the haiku poet
 1643 in poetry
 1642 in poetry
 1641 in poetry
 1640 in poetry - Biag ni Lam-ang first transcribed by Pedro Bucaneg

 1630s 
 1639 in poetry
 1638 in poetry
 1637 in poetry Death of Ben Jonson, important English poet, playwright, actor
 1636 in poetry
 1635 in poetry
 1634 in poetry
 1633 in poetry
 1632 in poetry
 1631 in poetry Death of John Donne, important English poet, essayist, author, preacher; - Birth of John Dryden influential English poet, literary critic, translator and playwright; Birth of Michael Wigglesworth (died 1705), English poet, colonist in America called "the most popular of early New England poets"
 1630 in poetry

 1620s 
 1629 in poetry
 1628 in poetry
 1627 in poetry
 1626 in poetry
 1625 in poetry
 1624 in poetry
 1623 in poetry
 1622 in poetry
 1621 in poetry
 1620 in poetry

 1610s 
 1619 in poetry
 1618 in poetry Death of Sir Walter Raleigh
 1617 in poetry
 1616 in poetry Death of William Shakespeare English poet, playwright and genius
 1615 in poetry
 1614 in poetry A Wife,  poem by Sir Thomas Overbury published posthumously
 1613 in poetry Death of Thomas Overbury English poet
 1612 in poetry
 1611 in poetry
 1610 in poetry

 1600s 
 1609 in poetry Publication of William Shakespeare's Sonnets 1608 in poetry Birth of John Milton, important English poet
 1607 in poetry
 1606 in poetry
 1605 in poetry
 1604 in poetry
 1603 in poetry
 1602 in poetry
 1601 in poetry
 1600 in poetry

16th century in poetry

 1590s 
 1599 in poetry Death of Edmund Spenser English poet
 1598 in poetry
 1597 in poetry
 1596 in poetry
 1595 in poetry
 1594 in poetry
 1593 in poetry Birth of George Herbert Welsh poet; - Death of Christopher Marlowe English poet
 1592 in poetry
 1591 in poetry
 1590 in poetry

 1580s 
 1589 in poetry
 1588 in poetry
 1587 in poetry
 1586 in poetry Birth of John Ford English poet and playwright (d. c. 1640)
 1585 in poetry Death of Pierre de Ronsard
 1584 in poetry
 1583 in poetry
 1582 in poetry
 1581 in poetry Jerusalem Delivered by Torquato Tasso; Birth of Thomas Overbury English poet (d.1613)
 1580 in poetry

 1570s 
 1579 in poetry
 1578 in poetry
 1577 in poetry Illustrated manuscript of the Hamzanama 1576 in poetry
 1575 in poetry
 1574 in poetry
 1573 in poetry
 1572 in poetry Luís Vaz de Comões – Os Lusíadas; Birth of John Donne, important English poet, essayist, author, preacher; - Birth of Ben Jonson, important English poet, playwright, actor
 1571 in poetry
 1570 in poetry

 1560s 
 1569 in poetry
 1568 in poetry
 1567 in poetry
 1566 in poetry
 1565 in poetry
 1564 in poetry Birth of William Shakespeare English poet, playwright, and genius, Christopher Marlowe English poet
 1563 in poetry
 1562 in poetry
 1561 in poetry
 1560 in poetry

 1550s 
 1559 in poetry
 1558 in poetry
 1557 in poetry
 1556 in poetry
 1555 in poetry
 1554 in poetry Miles Huggarde, The Assault of the Sacrament of the Altar; Henry Howard, The Fourth Boke of Virgill, Intreating of the Love Betweene Aeneas & Dido; Sir David Lindsay, The Monarche 1553 in poetry Anonymous, Pierce the Ploughmans Crede; Gavin Douglas, translator, Aeneid, The Palis of Honoure, second, revised edition (publication year conjectural)
 1552 in poetry Birth of Edmund Spenser, Walter Raleigh; Works: Thomas Churchyard, A Myrrour for Man 1551 in poetry Robert Crowley, published anonymously, Philargyrie of Greate Britayne; or, The Fable of the Great Giant 1550 in poetry Charles Bansley, The Pride of Women; Robert Crowley, One and Thyrtye Epigrammes; John Heywood, An Hundred Epigrammes; William Langland (attributed), Piers Plowman, the B text

 1540s 
 1549 in poetry
 1548 in poetry
 1547 in poetry
 1546 in poetry
 1545 in poetry
 1544 in poetry
 1543 in poetry
 1542 in poetry
 1541 in poetry
 1540 in poetry

 1530s 
 1539 in poetry
 1538 in poetry
 1537 in poetry
 1536 in poetry
 1535 in poetry
 1534 in poetry
 1533 in poetry
 1532 in poetry
 1531 in poetry
 1530 in poetry

 1520s 
 1529 in poetry
 1528 in poetry
 1527 in poetry
 1526 in poetry
 1525 in poetry
 1524 in poetry Birth of Pierre de Ronsard
 1523 in poetry
 1522 in poetry
 1521 in poetry
 1520 in poetry

 1510s 
 1519 in poetry
 1518 in poetry
 1517 in poetry
 1516 in poetry
 1515 in poetry
 1514 in poetry
 1513 in poetry
 1512 in poetry
 1511 in poetry
 1510 in poetry

 1500s 
 1509 in poetry
 1508 in poetry
 1507 in poetry
 1506 in poetry
 1505 in poetry
 1504 in poetry
 1503 in poetry
 1502 in poetry
 1501 in poetry Judita - Marko Marulić
 1500 in poetry La Araucana - Alonso de Ercilla

15th century in poetry

 1490s 
 1499 in poetry La Celestina by Fernando de Rojas
 1498 in poetry
 1497 in poetry
 1496 in poetry
 1495 in poetry
 1494 in poetry
 1493 in poetry
 1492 in poetry
 1491 in poetry
 1490 in poetry

 1480s 
 1489 in poetry
 1488 in poetry
 1487 in poetry
 1486 in poetry
 1485 in poetry
 1484 in poetry
 1483 in poetry
 1482 in poetry
 1481 in poetry
 1480 in poetry

 1470s 
 1479 in poetry
 1478 in poetry
 1477 in poetry
 1476 in poetry
 1475 in poetry
 1474 in poetry
 1473 in poetry
 1472 in poetry
 1471 in poetry
 1470 in poetry

 1460s 
 1469 in poetry
 1468 in poetry
 1467 in poetry
 1466 in poetry
 1465 in poetry
 1464 in poetry
 1463 in poetry c. Death of François Villon 
 1462 in poetry
 1461 in poetry
 1460 in poetry

 1450s 
 1459 in poetry
 1458 in poetry
 1457 in poetry
 1456 in poetry
 1455 in poetry
 1454 in poetry
 1453 in poetry
 1452 in poetry
 1451 in poetry
 1450 in poetry

 1440s 
 1449 in poetry
 1448 in poetry
 1447 in poetry
 1446 in poetry
 1445 in poetry
 1444 in poetry
 1443 in poetry
 1442 in poetry
 1441 in poetry
 1440 in poetry

 1430s 
 1439 in poetry
 1438 in poetry
 1437 in poetry
 1436 in poetry
 1435 in poetry
 1434 in poetry
 1433 in poetry
 1432 in poetry
 1431 in poetry c. Birth of François Villon 
 1430 in poetry

 1420s 
 1429 in poetry
 1428 in poetry
 1427 in poetry
 1426 in poetry
 1425 in poetry
 1424 in poetry
 1423 in poetry
 1422 in poetry
 1421 in poetry
 1420 in poetry

 1410s 
 1419 in poetry
 1418 in poetry
 1417 in poetry
 1416 in poetry
 1415 in poetry
 1414 in poetry
 1413 in poetry
 1412 in poetry
 1411 in poetry
 1410 in poetry

 1400s 
 1409 in poetry
 1408 in poetry
 1407 in poetry
 1406 in poetry
 1405 in poetry
 1404 in poetry
 1403 in poetry
 1402 in poetry
 1401 in poetry
 1400 in poetry Death of Geoffrey Chaucer

14th century in poetry

 1390s 
 1399 in poetry
 1398 in poetry
 1397 in poetry
 1396 in poetry
 1395 in poetry
 1394 in poetry
 1393 in poetry
 1392 in poetry
 1391 in poetry
 1390 in poetry

 1380s 
 1389 in poetry Death of Hafez
 1388 in poetry
 1387 in poetry
 1386 in poetry
 1385 in poetry
 1384 in poetry
 1383 in poetry
 1382 in poetry
 1381 in poetry
 1380 in poetry

 1370s 
 1379 in poetry
 1378 in poetry
 1377 in poetry
 1376 in poetry
 1375 in poetry John Barbour's The Brus 1374 in poetry
 1373 in poetry
 1372 in poetry
 1371 in poetry
 1370 in poetry

 1360s 
 1369 in poetry
 1368 in poetry
 1367 in poetry
 1366 in poetry
 1365 in poetry
 1364 in poetry
 1363 in poetry
 1362 in poetry
 1361 in poetry
 1360 in poetry Approximate date of the Mocedades de Rodrigo 1350s 
 1359 in poetry
 1358 in poetry
 1357 in poetry
 1356 in poetry
 1355 in poetry
 1354 in poetry
 1353 in poetry
 1352 in poetry
 1351 in poetry
 1350 in poetry

 1340s 
 1349 in poetry
 1348 in poetry
 1347 in poetry
 1346 in poetry
 1345 in poetry
 1344 in poetry
 1343 in poetry (c.) Birth of Geoffrey Chaucer, known as father of English poetry (died 1400)
 1342 in poetry
 1341 in poetry
 1340 in poetry

 1330s 
 1339 in poetry
 1338 in poetry
 1337 in poetry
 1336 in poetry
 1335 in poetry
 1334 in poetry
 1333 in poetry
 1332 in poetry
 1331 in poetry
 1330 in poetry

 1320s 
 1329 in poetry
 1328 in poetry
 1327 in poetry
 1326 in poetry
 1325 in poetry Birth of Hafez, Persian poet
 1324 in poetry
 1323 in poetry
 1322 in poetry
 1321 in poetry
 1320 in poetry

 1310s 
 1319 in poetry
 1318 in poetry
 1317 in poetry
 1316 in poetry
 1315 in poetry
 1314 in poetry
 1313 in poetry
 1312 in poetry
 1311 in poetry
 1310 in poetry

 1300s 
 1309 in poetry
 1308 in poetry
 1307 in poetry
 1306 in poetry
 1305 in poetry
 1304 in poetry
 1303 in poetry
 1302 in poetry
 1301 in poetry
 1300 in poetry Kebra Nagast, Sundiata Keita in oral form

13th century in poetry

 1290s 
 1299 in poetry
 1298 in poetry
 1297 in poetry
 1296 in poetry
 1295 in poetry
 1294 in poetry
 1293 in poetry
 1292 in poetry
 1291 in poetry Death of Saadi
 1290 in poetry

 1280s 
 1289 in poetry
 1288 in poetry
 1287 in poetry The Jewang Un'gi by Yi Seung-hyu
 1286 in poetry
 1285 in poetry
 1284 in poetry
 1283 in poetry
 1282 in poetry
 1281 in poetry
 1280 in poetry

 1270s 
 1279 in poetry
 1278 in poetry
 1277 in poetry
 1276 in poetry
 1275 in poetry
 1274 in poetry
 1273 in poetry
 1272 in poetry
 1271 in poetry
 1270 in poetry

 1260s 
 1269 in poetry
 1268 in poetry
 1267 in poetry
 1266 in poetry
 1265 in poetry
 1264 in poetry
 1263 in poetry
 1262 in poetry
 1261 in poetry
 1260 in poetry

 1250s 
 1259 in poetry
 1258 in poetry
 1257 in poetry
 1256 in poetry
 1255 in poetry
 1254 in poetry
 1253 in poetry
 1252 in poetry
 1251 in poetry
 1250 in poetry

 1240s 
 1249 in poetry
 1248 in poetry
 1247 in poetry
 1246 in poetry
 1245 in poetry
 1244 in poetry
 1243 in poetry
 1242 in poetry
 1241 in poetry
 1240 in poetry

 1230s 
 1239 in poetry
 1238 in poetry
 1237 in poetry
 1236 in poetry
 1235 in poetry
 1234 in poetry
 1233 in poetry
 1232 in poetry
 1231 in poetry
 1230 in poetry

 1220s 
 1229 in poetry
 1228 in poetry
 1227 in poetry
 1226 in poetry
 1225 in poetry
 1224 in poetry
 1223 in poetry
 1222 in poetry
 1221 in poetry
 1220 in poetry

 1210s 
 1219 in poetry
 1218 in poetry
 1217 in poetry
 1216 in poetry
 1215 in poetry
 1214 in poetry
 1213 in poetry
 1212 in poetry
 1211 in poetry
 1210 in poetry Birth of Saadi, Persian poet

 1200s 
 1209 in poetry
 1208 in poetry Estimated date of the Gesta Danorum 1207 in poetry
 1206 in poetry
 1205 in poetry
 1204 in poetry
 1203 in poetry
 1202 in poetry
 1201 in poetry
 1200 in poetry

12th century in poetry

 1190s 
 1199 in poetry
 1198 in poetry
 1197 in poetry
 1196 in poetry
 1195 in poetry Approximate date of El Cantar de mio Cid 1194 in poetry
 1193 in poetry
 1192 in poetry
 1191 in poetry
 1190 in poetry Approximate date of The Tale of Igor's Campaign 1180s 
 1189 in poetry
 1188 in poetry
 1187 in poetry
 1186 in poetry
 1185 in poetry
 1184 in poetry
 1183 in poetry
 1182 in poetry
 1181 in poetry
 1180 in poetry

 1170s 
 1179 in poetry
 1178 in poetry
 1177 in poetry
 1176 in poetry
 1175 in poetry
 1174 in poetry
 1173 in poetry
 1172 in poetry
 1171 in poetry
 1170 in poetry

 1160s 
 1169 in poetry
 1168 in poetry
 1167 in poetry
 1166 in poetry
 1165 in poetry
 1164 in poetry
 1163 in poetry
 1162 in poetry
 1161 in poetry
 1160 in poetry

 1150s 
 1159 in poetry
 1158 in poetry
 1157 in poetry
 1156 in poetry
 1155 in poetry
 1154 in poetry
 1153 in poetry
 1152 in poetry
 1151 in poetry
 1150 in poetry

 1140s 
 1149 in poetry
 1148 in poetry
 1147 in poetry
 1146 in poetry
 1145 in poetry
 1144 in poetry
 1143 in poetry
 1142 in poetry
 1141 in poetry
 1140 in poetry

 1130s 
 1139 in poetry
 1138 in poetry
 1137 in poetry
 1136 in poetry
 1135 in poetry
 1134 in poetry
 1133 in poetry
 1132 in poetry
 1131 in poetry
 1130 in poetry

 1120s 
 1129 in poetry
 1128 in poetry
 1127 in poetry
 1126 in poetry
 1125 in poetry
 1124 in poetry
 1123 in poetry
 1122 in poetry
 1121 in poetry
 1120 in poetry

 1110s 
 1119 in poetry
 1118 in poetry
 1117 in poetry
 1116 in poetry
 1115 in poetry
 1114 in poetry
 1113 in poetry
 1112 in poetry
 1111 in poetry
 1110 in poetry

 1100s 
 1109 in poetry
 1108 in poetry
 1107 in poetry
 1106 in poetry
 1105 in poetry
 1104 in poetry
 1103 in poetry
 1102 in poetry
 1101 in poetry
 1100 in poetry The Knight in the Panther's Skin by Shota Rustaveli

11th century in poetry

 1090s 
 1099 in poetry
 1098 in poetry
 1097 in poetry
 1096 in poetry
 1095 in poetry
 1094 in poetry
 1093 in poetry
 1092 in poetry
 1091 in poetry
 1090 in poetry

 1080s 
 1089 in poetry
 1088 in poetry
 1087 in poetry
 1086 in poetry
 1085 in poetry
 1084 in poetry
 1083 in poetry
 1082 in poetry
 1081 in poetry
 1080 in poetry

 1070s 
 1079 in poetry
 1078 in poetry
 1077 in poetry
 1076 in poetry
 1075 in poetry
 1074 in poetry
 1073 in poetry
 1072 in poetry
 1071 in poetry
 1070 in poetry

 1060s 

 1050s 

 1040s 

 1030s 

 1020s 

 1010s 

 1000s 

10th century in poetry

 990s 

 980s 

 970s 
 977 - The Shahnameh by Ferdowsi

 960s 

 950s 

 940s 

 930s 

 920s 

 910s 

 900s 
Earliest possible date of Lebor Gabála Érenn

5th century in poetry – 9th century in poetry

 890s 

 880s 

 870s 

 860s 

 850s 

 840s 

 830s 

 820s 

 810s 

 800s 

 700s 

 600s 
 600 – Venantius Fortunatus born (c. 530 – c. 600), Latin poet and hymnodist from Northern Italy
 615 – Saint Columbanus (born 543), Hiberno-Latin poet and writer
 625 – Maymun Ibn Qays Al-a'sha born (died 625)
 661 – Labīd died this year (born 560); Arabic poet

 500s 
 500 – Procopius born about this year (died 565)
 505 – Blossius Aemilius Dracontius born about this year (born 455) of Carthage, a Latin poet
 521
 July 17 – Magnus Felix Ennodius died (born 474 – July 17, 521), Bishop of Pavia and poet, writing in Latin
 November – Jacob of Serugh died (born 451), writing in Syriac
 530 – Venantius Fortunatus born (c. 530 – c. 600), Latin poet and hymnodist from Northern Italy
 534 – Taliesin born about this year (died c. 599), the earliest identified Welsh poet
 536 – Agathias born about this year (died 582/594); Ancient Greek poet and historian
 539 – Chilperic I born (died September 584) Frankish king of Neustria and a Latin poet
 543 – Saint Columbanus (died 615), Hiberno-Latin poet and writer
 544 – Arator declaims his poem De Actibus Apostolorum in the Church of San Pietro-in-Vinculi
 554 – 'Abid ibn al-Abris died about this year; Arabic poet
 560:
 Samaw'al ibn 'Adiya died about this year; Jewish poet writing in Arabic
 Labīd born this year (died 661); Arabic poet
 565 – Procopius died (born about 500)
 570 – Maymun Ibn Qays Al-a'sha born (died 625)
 580 – Antara Ibn Shaddad died about this year; Arabic poet
 584
 (September) – Chilperic I died (born 539) Frankish king of Neustria and a Latin poet
 Amr ibn Kulthum died about this year; Arabic poet
 599 – Taliesin died about this year (born c. 534), the earliest identified Welsh poet

 400s 
 Unknown – Compilation of the Mahavamsa by Buddhist monks
 451 – Jacob of Serugh born (died November 521), writing in Syriac
 455 – Blossius Aemilius Dracontius born about this year (died c. 505) of Carthage, a Latin poet
 474 – Magnus Felix Ennodius (died July 17, 521), Bishop of Pavia and poet, writing in Latin

 Poetry before the 5th century 
 4th century in poetry
 3rd century in poetry
 2nd century in poetry
 1st century in poetry
 1st century BC in poetry
 2nd century BC in poetry
 3rd century BC in poetry
 4th century BC in poetry
 5th century BC in poetry
 6th century BC in poetry
 7th century BC in poetry

Before 1000 BC in poetry
 11th century BC – earliest works in the Classic of Poetry c. 1500 BC – Earliest possible date for composition of the "family poems" in the Rig Veda c. 23rd century BC – Enheduanna, The Exaltation of Inanna and "Sumerian Temple Hymns"
 c. 26th century BC – Kesh Temple Hymn''

See also
 History of poetry

References

Poetry

Poetry
Poetry